The Northeastern University Women Writers Project (formerly the Brown University Women Writers Project) or WWP, founded in 1986 at Brown University, is a long-term research and publication project which focuses on making texts from early modern women writers in the English language  available online. The Women Writers Project maintains "Women Writers Online" an electronic collection of rare or difficult to obtain works written or co-authored by women from the sixteenth century to the mid nineteenth century. In addition, the WWP is actively engaged in researching the complex issues involved in representing manuscripts and early printed texts in digital form and holds an occasional conference, Women in the Archives, as well as teaching workshops in text encoding and other practices central to digital humanities.

History
The Brown University Women Writers Project developed at the end of the 1980s from the marriage of two communities, early modern women’s studies and electronic text encoding.

As a method of preservation and to make the texts more widely accessible, the WWP transcribed an initial digital collection of about 200 texts in the first five years and experimented with publishing editions of selected works in traditional print format. The 15-volume series “Women Writers in English, 1350–1850” is still available.

In 1993, with the publication of the expanded Text Encoding Initiative or TEI guidelines, the WWP began a three-year period of research on how to use the new guidelines to represent early women’s texts. During this time, few new texts were added to the collection, but a new set of encoding methods and improved systems of documentation and training took place.

From 1996 onwards, new texts were once again encoded with the new TEI standards. Between 1997 and 2000, funded by a grant from the Andrew W. Mellon Foundation, the WWP developed “Renaissance Women Online,” a project studying the impact of electronic texts on teaching and research. The project included the creation of introductory materials for 100 texts, currently constituting a sub-collection of Women Writers Online. In 1999 Women Writers Online was published, making the corpus available online.

Since the release of Women Writers Online, initiatives include publishing a Guide to Scholarly Text Encoding, offering workshops and seminars in text encoding, and hosting a periodic conference, Women in the Archives.

In 2013 the WWP moved from Brown University in Providence, Rhode Island to Northeastern University in Boston, Massachusetts.

Women Writers Online
Women Writers Online is a full-text collection of early women’s writing in English ranging from 1526 to 1850. As of 1 February 2022, the database contains 439 individual works, with around fifteen new texts being added to the collection every year.

The focus of the corpus is currently on hard to find or generally inaccessible texts from both well known and more obscure writers. 
Authors included in the corpus include, among many others:
 Anna Laetitia Barbauld
 Aphra Behn
 Margaret Cavendish
 Queen Elizabeth I
 Margaret Fell
 Felicia Hemans
 Catherine Parr
 Mary Sidney
 Mary Wollstonecraft

Access to Women Writers Online is available through a web-based interface with a paid subscription, available to both institutions and individuals. There is also a free one-month trial period for potential subscribers. The WWP usually makes their textbase available free of charge for the month of March, in honor of Women's History Month.

In March 2012, the WWP released a new interface for Women Writers Online.

Resources and outreach
The WWP hosts a number of text encoding workshops and seminars throughout the year for various skill levels. From 2008 through 2011 the WWP also hosted an annual conference Women in the Archives in collaboration with the Sarah Doyle Women's Center and several other groups at Brown University.

In addition to the Women Writers Online collection, the WWP also offers some public resources helpful for researchers and teachers interested in early modern women writers. These include orientations for getting the most out of researching within the online collection, possible assignments that take advantage of the online user interface, and syllabi submitted by professors that incorporate the online texts and focus on courses in Renaissance and early modern literature, women’s studies, and related subjects.

See also
 List of women writers

References

External links 
 
List of texts in Women Writers Online

Brown University
Organizations for women writers
Text Encoding Initiative
1986 establishments in Rhode Island
Organizations established in 1986
Northeastern University
Digital humanities projects